The tenth series of the British children's television series The Dumping Ground began broadcasting on 30 September 2022 on CBBC. The series follows the lives of the children living in the fictional children's care home of Ashdene Ridge, nicknamed by them "The Dumping Ground". It is set to consist of twenty thirty-minute episodes. It is the 20th series in The Story of Tracy Beaker franchise (The Beaker Girls having aired between this and the ninth series).

Cast

Main

Guest

Episodes

References

2022 British television seasons
The Dumping Ground